Leland Myrick is an author and illustrator. In 1999, he was nominated for an Ignatz Award for Promising New Talent for The Sweet Collection, and in 2004 he was awarded a Xeric Grant to create Bright Elegy. He illustrated the New York Times-bestselling Feynman (2011), a graphic biography of Richard Feynman written by Jim Ottaviani for First Second Books. Myrick's first fantasy novel, The Ten, was named to Kirkus Reviews Best Indie Books of 2012.

Myrick was born in Missouri and currently lives in St. Charles, Missouri.

Published works

Graphic novels 

 The Sweet Collection (2000)
 Bright Elegy (2004)
 Missouri Boy (2006)  
 Feynman (written by Jim Ottaviani, 2011): Biography of Richard Feynman
 Hawking (written by Jim Ottaviani, 2019): Biography of Stephen Hawking

Graphic stories 

 "Storm Coming" (9-11: Artists Respond, vol. 1, 2002)
 "Paper Airplanes" (Happy Endings, 2002)
 "Sustain This Song" (Flight, vol. 7, 2010)
 "The Collector" (Flight, vol. 8, 2011)

Novels 

 The Ten (Kingdom of the Graves series, book 1, 2012)
 Mark of the Blooded (Kingdom of the Graves series, book 2, 2012)

References

External links 
Official website

21st-century American novelists
American male novelists
Living people
21st-century American short story writers
21st-century American male writers
Year of birth missing (living people)